Carson Nugget is a hotel and casino located in Carson City, Nevada. The Carson Nugget is nearly 30,000 square feet. The property features slots, table games, keno, three restaurants, meeting spaces and 83 hotel rooms.

History
Richard Graves opened the casino, known then as the Carson City Nugget, on March 1, 1954. The Carson City Nugget was one of Nevada's largest and most prosperous casinos when Graves sold it to Richard E. Pogue and Chester H. Armstrong in September 1956. After Pogue died, the Carson City Nugget was sold to a group of six purchasers for $525,000 in December 1958. The group included three Adams brothers who would manage the casino.

As of 2008, the Carson Nugget had become the oldest continually operating casino in Carson City. The casino was sold in 2015 to Dean DiLullo, the CEO of M1 Gaming in Reno.

Awful Awful Burger 
Graves opened multiple "Nugget" casinos, including the Little Nugget in Reno, and the Nugget Casino Resort in Sparks. At each of these locations, he introduced the "Awful Awful Burger", a double-patty sandwich that he had first created and sold in Idaho. The Awful Awful Burger, named so because it is considered "awful big and awful good", has come to be something of a local delicacy. , the Carson Nugget is the only remaining purveyor of the burger.

References

External links
 

1954 establishments in Nevada
Casino hotels
Casinos completed in 1954
Casinos in Carson City, Nevada
Hotels in Carson City, Nevada
Resorts in Nevada